Prizrenac is a fortress located 12 km southwest of Novo Brdo, Kosovo, on the top of the hill (856 m) that dominates the environment.

See also
Novo Brdo (fortress)
Prilepac (fortress)
List of fortresses in Serbia
List of fortresses in Kosovo

References

Forts in Serbia
Forts in Kosovo
Medieval Serbian sites in Kosovo